Linda Jo Rizzo (born 1 April 1955, in New York City) is an American singer, songwriter and producer, with Italian roots, currently based in Germany. Originally from the United States, she was a photo model and studied nourishing sciences in New York. There she met Bobby Orlando and participated in his group, The Flirts, from 1983 to 1984. In 1984, Rizzo moved to Germany and started her own music career there.

Rizzo was the owner of an Italian music restaurant in Munich called Piazza Linda, which was sold in August 2008.

Discography

Albums
 Passion (1989) (bootleg)
 Best of Linda Jo Rizzo (1999)
 Day of the Light (2012)
 P.A.S.S.I.O.N. (2013) (The Flirts Hits featuring Linda Jo Rizzo)
 Fly Me High (2015)

Singles
 1985: "Fly Me High / "Welcome to Cairo"
 1986: "You're My First You're My Last" / "I've Got the Night"
 1986: "Heartflash (Tonight)" / "Just One Word"
 1987: "Perfect Love" / "No Lies"
 1988: "Passion" / "Hey Joe"
 1989: "Keep Trying" / "Listen to the D.J."
 1991: "Quando Quando"
 1993: "Passion" / "Just the Way You Like It"
 1994: "Meet the Flintstones" (Stone-Age feat. Linda Jo)
 2012: "Heartflash, Passion & You're My First, You're My Last 2012"
 2013: "Day of the Light"
 2013: "Out of the Shadows" (TQ & Linda Jo Rizzo)
 2017: "I Want You Tonight" (Linda Jo Rizzo & Tom Hooker)

See also
 Euro disco

External links
 Linda Jo Rizzo on Facebook – Official fanpage.
 
 
 
 
  (actress)
  (composer)
 LindaJorizzo.De – Personal site in German.
 PiazzaLinda.de
 Interview with Linda Jo Rizzo

1955 births
Living people
21st-century American women singers
21st-century American singers
American emigrants to Germany
American female models
American women pop singers
American Italo disco musicians
American hi-NRG musicians
English-language singers from Italy
Italian Italo disco musicians
Italian record producers
American people of Italian descent
American women record producers
American women in electronic music
Songwriters from New York (state)